Tumor necrosis factor receptor superfamily member 12A also known as the TWEAK receptor (TWEAKR) is a protein that in humans is encoded by the TNFRSF12A gene.

References

Further reading

Clusters of differentiation
TNF receptor family